Radičević is a Serbian surname derived from a masculine given name Radič. It may refer to:

 Branko Radičević (1824–1853), Serbian poet
 Jovanka Radičević (born 1986), Montenegrin handball player
 Nikola Radičević (born 1994), Serbian basketball player

Serbian surnames
Patronymic surnames
Surnames from given names